Turkey took part in the Eurovision Song Contest 2001. The country was represented by Sedat Yüce with the song "Sevgiliye Son" written by Figen Çakmak, Nurdan Güneri and composed by Semih Güneri.

Before Eurovision

24. Eurovision Şarkı Yarışması Türkiye Finali 
The final took place on 23 February 2001 at the TRT Studios in Ankara, hosted by Ömer Önder and Meltem Ersan. Ten songs competed and the winner was determined by an expert jury.

At Eurovision
On the night of the contest Sedat Yüce performed 15th in the running order following France and preceding United Kingdom. At the close of the voting Sevgiliye Son had received 41 points placing Turkey 11th.

Voting

References

2001
Countries in the Eurovision Song Contest 2001
Eurovision